Neocerambyx is a genus of round-necked longhorn beetles of the subfamily Cerambycinae.

Species
BioLib.cz includes:
 Neocerambyx bakboensis Miroshnikov, 2018
 Neocerambyx dierli (Heyrovský, 1976)
 Neocerambyx elenae Lazarev, 2019
 Neocerambyx gigas J. Thomson, 1878
 Neocerambyx grandis Gahan, 1891
 Neocerambyx guangxiensis Li, Lu & Chen, 2020
 Neocerambyx katarinae Holzschuh, 2009
 Neocerambyx luzonicus Hüdepohl, 1987
 Neocerambyx opulentus Holzschuh, 1998
 Neocerambyx paris (Wiedemann, 1821)
 Neocerambyx pellitus (Breuning & Itzinger, 1943)
 Neocerambyx pubescens Fisher, 1938
 Neocerambyx raddei Blessig & Solsky, 1872
 Neocerambyx rugicollis (Gressitt, 1948)
 Neocerambyx scapulatus (Hüdepohl, 1994)
 Neocerambyx subregularis (Schwarzer, 1931)
 Neocerambyx theresae (Pic, 1946)
 Neocerambyx unicolor (Gahan, 1906)
 Neocerambyx venustus (Pascoe, 1859)
 Neocerambyx vitalisi Pic, 1923

Note: N. oenochrous is now placed in the genus Hemadius.

References

Cerambycini
Cerambycidae genera
Beetles of Asia